The Merry Men are the group of outlaws who follow Robin Hood in English literature and folklore. The group appears in the earliest ballads about Robin Hood and remains popular in modern adaptations.

History

The Merry Men are Robin Hood's group who work to rob from the rich and give to the poor. They have antagonized the tyrannical rule of Prince John while King Richard is fighting in the Crusades. This also puts them into conflict with Prince John's minions, Guy of Gisbourne and the Sheriff of Nottingham.

The early ballads give specific names to only three companions: Little John, Much the Miller's Son, and William Scarlock or Scathelock, the Will Scarlet of later traditions. Joining them are between 20 and "seven score" (140) outlawed yeomen. The most prominent of the Merry Men is Robin's second-in-command, Little John. He appears in the earliest ballads, and is mentioned in even earlier sources, such as Andrew of Wyntoun's Orygynale Chronicle of around 1420 and Walter Bower's expansion of the Scotichronicon, completed around 1440. Later ballads name additional Merry Men, some of whom appear in only one or two ballads, while others, like the minstrel Alan-a-Dale and the jovial Friar Tuck, became fully attached to the legend. Several of the Robin Hood ballads tell the story of how individual Merry Men join the group; this is frequently accomplished by defeating Robin in a duel.

The phrase "merry man" was originally a generic term for any follower or companion of an outlaw, knight, or similar leader. Robin's band are called "mery men" in the oldest known Robin Hood ballad, "Robin Hood and the Monk", which survives in a manuscript completed after 1450.

Known members
 Little John – Robin Hood's lieutenant. Later stories depict him as a huge man who joins the band after fighting Robin with quarterstaves over a river.
 Much, the Miller's Son – A grown man and a seasoned fighter in the early ballads. Later stories depict him as one of the youngest of the Merry Men.
 Will Scarlet – Another very early companion, appearing in ballads like "A Gest of Robyn Hode". In "Robin Hood Newly Revived" he is a skilled swordsman and Robin's nephew.
 Arthur a Bland – He appears in only one ballad, "Robin Hood and the Tanner". He is an accused poacher who bests Robin in a fight and joins the band.
 David of Doncaster – appears in one ballad in the Child collection, Robin Hood and the Golden Arrow. The sheriff is giving an archery contest, and David, "a brave young man," warns Robin against going, because it is a trap, which advice inspires Robin to take precautions against capture.<ref>Francis James Child, English and Scottish Popular Ballads, "Robin Hood and the Golden Arrow"</ref> He reappears in later adaptations, both books and movies. For example, in Stories of Robin Hood and His Merry Outlaws by J. Walker McSpadden, he is made a "merry cobbler" and again warns Robin of the dangers of the archery competition, appearing only otherwise in the scene with King Richard in the woods. Daniel Peacock portrayed him in the 1991 film, Robin Hood: Prince of Thieves, though his character went by the nickname "Bull". In Clayton Emery's Tales of Robin Hood, David is a dependable Merry Man who wears his dark hair long since Royal Foresters cut off his ears.
He features more frequently in Howard Pyle's work. In The Merry Adventures of Robin Hood, he appears as one of the youngest in the band, and a wrestler. As in Robin Hood and the Golden Arrow, he warns Robin that a competition is a trap, inspiring Robin to take the same precautions as in the ballad, but also in other tales.  In A Gest of Robyn Hode, Sir Richard at the Lee saves an anonymous yeoman wrestler, who had won in a bout but was nearly murdered because he was a stranger, and apologised for the delay, with Robin saying that helping any yeomen pleases him, but in Pyle's account, the wrestler is David of Doncaster, and Robin is deeply grateful. He also appears in various other adventures as a minor character; where Robin Hood Rescuing Will Stutly has an unnamed "brave young man" questioning a palmer to learn about the hanging, Pyle specifies that it is David who asks.
 Will Stutely – He appears in two ballads, "Robin Hood and Little John" and "Robin Hood Rescuing Will Stutly". In the former, he gives Little John his outlaw name; in the latter, he must be rescued after he is caught spying by the Sheriff of Nottingham. He is occasionally confused with Will Scarlet. Stutely appears in various Robin Hood children's novels, such as Howard Pyle's The Merry Adventures of Robin Hood, which includes the tale of Will's rescue and also mentions that he likes to play pranks, and the occasional film. 
 Friar Tuck – The resident Clergyman of the band. Tuck developed separately from the Robin Hood tradition; similar characters appear in 15th- and 16th-century plays, and an early 15th-century outlaw used the alias Friar Tuck. A fighting friar appears in the ballad "Robin Hood and the Curtal Friar", though he is not named. Robin and the friar engage in a battle of wits, which at one point involves the holy man carrying the outlaw across a river, only to toss him in. In the end, the friar joins the Merry Men. Later stories portray Tuck as more ale-loving and jovial than belligerent.
 Alan-a-Dale – A roving minstrel. He appears in the later ballad "Robin Hood and Allan-a-Dale", in which Robin helps him rescue his sweetheart who is being forced into marriage with another man. Despite his relatively late appearance, he became a popular character in later versions.
 Gilbert Whitehand (or Gilbert with the White Hand) – Portrayed in "A Gest of Robyn Hode" as a skilled archer nearly equal to Robin. He appears along with other Merry Men during the shooting match for the gold and silver arrow, and again in Barnsdale Forest during a visit by the disguised king.
 Reynold Greenleaf – Although this name was used as an alias by Little John in "A Gest of Robyn Hode" when he tricked his way into the Sheriff's service, there is another Reynold presented later in the ballad as a separate member of the Merry Men who competed in the archery match for the gold and silver arrow alongside Robin, Little John and others of the band.
 Maid Marian – Robin Hood's romantic interest. Marian developed separately from the Robin Hood tradition; the medieval French play Jeu de Robin et Marion tells the story of the shepherdess Marian and the knight Robin, and is unrelated to Robin Hood. The medieval archetype of Marian became associated with English and Scottish May Day festivities, and was eventually associated with Robin Hood. She is the protagonist of the ballad "Robin Hood and Maid Marian" and is mentioned in "Robin Hood and Queen Katherine" and "Robin Hood's Golden Prize". In "Maid Marian" she joins the Merry Men by fighting Robin to a draw while both are in disguise. In some Victorian literature she takes a more passive role as a noblewoman and Robin's desired, but this all but ended in the 20th century as Marian resumed her role as a cross-dressing tomboy and a capable fighter. She is depicted as such in the 1952 film The Story of Robin Hood and His Merrie Men, the television series Robin of Sherwood, and the 1991 film Robin Hood: Prince of Thieves. The children's comedy television series Maid Marian and her Merry Men takes this a step further by placing Marian in charge of the group. In the 2006 series Robin Hood, Marian works as a double agent, feeding Robin critical information about the Sheriff.
 The Tinker – A tinker (a tinsmith and mender of utensils) who tried to capture Robin for the reward money, but eventually became one of his Merry Men. Though he is not named in the original ballad "Robin Hood and the Tinker" he is given various names in later adaptations. Howard Pyle calls him Wat o' the Crabstaff (a reference to the quarterstaff he uses as a weapon), while in Bold Robin Hood and His Outlaw Band by Louis Rhead he is named Dick o' Banbury.
 The Cook – A cook who lived in the household of the Sheriff. Sometime after Little John tricked his way into the Sheriff's service, he and the cook fought each other with swords. Neither one besting the other, they became friends and the cook was invited by Little John to join Robin's band. Though he is not named in "A Gest of Robyn Hode" (in which he first appeared), he is given various names in later adaptations. In The Life and Adventures of Robin Hood by John B. Marsh he is known by the epithet Firepan, and his skill as a cook is matched by his fame as a swordsman. In Stories of Robin Hood and His Merry Outlaws by J. Walker McSpadden, it is none other than Much himself who originally served the Sheriff as his cook until he joined the Merry Men after his duel with Little John.
 The Ranger – A forester who was responsible for protecting the king's deer. When he encountered Robin and learned that he was poaching, they fought each other with swords and then with quarterstaves. The forester (who is not named) defeated Robin who then offered him a place among his company of outlaws as told in "Robin Hood and the Ranger".
 The Pinder – A pinder (an impounder of stray animals) who encountered Robin, Little John and Will Scarlet together. Like other tales in which Robin duels an opponent and meets his match, they engaged in swordplay until a truce was made. The pinder was then invited to join the Merry Men which he pledged to do after the day of Michaelmas when the contract with his former employer ran out, as told in "The Jolly Pinder of Wakefield"."The Jolly Pinder of Wakefield" Ballad Text; in Knight and Ohlgren (1997) Though the character is not identified in the ballad, he is named George a Greene in the Robin Hood play George a Greene, the Pinner of Wakefield printed in 1599, the 1632 chapbook The Famous History of George a Greene, Pinder of Wakefield, and other similar works of the period. This is the name likewise used by Maude Radford Warren in her 1914 collection Robin Hood and His Merry Men where he also serves as a self-appointed guardian of the peace. Henry Gilbert in Robin Hood (1912) calls him Sim of Wakefield.
 The Scotchman – A Scot who Robin met while on a journey north. He offered to serve Robin who refused at first, thinking that he would prove false, but then he agreed on the condition that they first engage in a duel. The Scot won the fight and became a member of Robin's band, as told in "Robin Hood and the Scotchman".
 The Three Yeomen – Three yeomen (landowning farmers) who were about to be hanged by the Sheriff of Nottingham for poaching until they were saved by Robin and a company of archers. They were taken back to the safety of the greenwood and joined Robin's band, as told in "Robin Hood and the Beggar" (version 1).

Modern additions
Several modern adaptations add a member to the group who is a Moor or Saracen:
 This began with the 1984–86 television series Robin of Sherwood, which included the character Nasir (portrayed by Mark Ryan), a former hashshashin who joins the Merry Men. 
 The character influenced the writers of the 1989–94 BBC TV children's series Maid Marian and Her Merry Men, which featured the black character Barrington (portrayed by Danny John Jules) 
 1991's Robin Hood: Prince of Thieves included the Moor Azeem (portrayed by Morgan Freeman).
 The 1993 Mel Brooks comedy Robin Hood: Men in Tights featured Dave Chappelle as Achoo, a parody of Freeman's Azeem comically depicted with modern African American mannerisms and speech.
 The 1997–99 television series The New Adventures of Robin Hood featured Kemal (portrayed by Hakim Alston), a Saracen who was a professional assassin in Palestine.
 The 2006 series Robin Hood introduced Djaq (portrayed by Anjali Jay), a Saracen ex-slave who is a girl disguised as a boy.
 In the 2018 film Robin Hood, Jamie Foxx portrays a Moor version of Little John.

In a 2012 episode of Once Upon a Time'', legendary Chinese folk heroine Mulan (portrayed by Jamie Chung)  becomes the first female member of Robin's band.

See also 
Social banditry

References

Further reading

 
Lists of fictional sidekicks
Robin Hood characters
Medieval legends